The 2007 FIFA Beach Soccer World Cup was the third edition of the FIFA Beach Soccer World Cup, governed by FIFA. Overall, this was the 13th edition of a world cup in beach soccer since the establishment of the Beach Soccer World Championships which ran from 1995 to 2004 but was not governed by FIFA. It took place in Rio de Janeiro, Brazil, from 2–11 November 2007.

The winners of the tournament were hosts Brazil, who won their second consecutive FIFA Beach Soccer World Cup title and their eleventh title overall.

Qualifying rounds

African zone 

The qualifiers to determine the two Africa nations who would play in the World Cup took place in Durban, South Africa for the second year running between July 3 and July 8. Eight nations took part in the competition, an increase on the six teams that participated in the 2006 Championship, which eventually saw Nigeria claim their first title, qualifying for the second successive World Cup and which saw Senegal finish in second place, qualifying for the first time.

Asian zone 

The Asian qualifiers took place in Dubai, United Arab Emirates, for the second time, between August 14 and August 18. The hosts, the United Arab Emirates qualified for the first time after beating Japan in the final of the championship, 4–3. Iran beat Bahrain in the third place play off to claim the third berth at the World Cup for the second year in a row.

European zone 

For the second year running, European nations qualified through being successful in the 2007 Euro Beach Soccer League. The nations who made it to the second stage of the Superfinal qualified to the World Cup being Portugal, France, Russia and Spain. To decide who would claim the fifth berth, the defeated nations in the competition came back to play in a straight knockout tournament, with the winner progressing to the World Cup. The nation which won the tournament was Italy who beat Switzerland in the final.

North, Central American, Caribbean and South American zone 

Due to the lack of interest from South American nations in the World Cup, CONMEBOL paired up with CONCACAF to hold the second joint Beach Soccer Championship, following 2005. Seven nations took part in the championship, three from South America and four from North America which took place between August 9 and August 12 in Acapulco, Mexico. The tournament saw the United States claim victory, after beating Uruguay 4–3 in the final. Argentina beat Mexico in the third place play off. Therefore, all four national teams mentioned qualified for the World Cup.

Oceanian zone 

The qualifiers to decide the one nation from Oceania that would be competing in the World Cup took place in Auckland, New Zealand, between August 31 and September 3. Despite Vanuatu dominating in the group stage, they lost in the final to the Solomon Islands, who claimed their second title and qualification for a second year in a row.

Hosts 
Brazil qualified automatically as the hosts.

Teams 
These are the teams that qualified to the World Cup:

Asian zone:
 
 
  (first appearance)

African zone:
 
  (first appearance)

European zone:
 
 
 
 
 

North, Central American and Caribbean zone:
  (first appearance)
 

Oceanian zone:
 

South American zone:
 
 

Hosts:

Players

Venue 
As with the two previous FIFA editions of the World Cup held in Rio, the tournament once again took place at the Copacabana Beach Soccer Arena.

Group stage 
The 16 teams were split into 4 groups of 4 teams. Each team played the other 3 teams in its group in a round-robin format, with the top two teams advancing to the quarter finals. The quarter finals, semi finals and the final itself was played in the form of a knockout tournament.

All matches are listed as local time in Rio de Janeiro, (UTC-3)

Group A

Group B

Group C

Group D

Knockout stage

Quarter finals

Semi-finals

Third place match

Final

Winners

Awards

Top scorers 

10 goals
  Buru
9 goals
  Morgan Plata
8 goals
  Bruno
  Madjer
7 goals
  Ricardo Villalobos
  Jeremy Basquaise
  Pape Koukpaki
  Ricar
6 goals
  Alan
  Andre
  Roberto Pasquali
5 goals
  Sidney
4 goals
  Amarelle
  Didier Samoun
  Júnior Negrão
  Stéphane François

4 goals (cont.)
  James Naka
  Haidar Bashir
  Javi Alvarez
  Mario Chimienti
  Shusei Yamauchi
  Gomis Mbengue
  Daniel
3 goals
  Oscar Gonzales
  Bakhit Alabadla
  Hamed Ghorbanpour
  Mohammad Ahmadzadeh
  Nico
  Joshua Nolz
  Isiaka Olawale
  Betinho
  Dmitry Shishin
  Benyam Astorga
  Ilya Leonov
  Paolo Palmacci
  Moslem Mesigar
  Bilro
  Ogbonnaya Okemmiri
  Uga Okpara

3 goals (cont.)
  Javier Torres
  Pampero
  Parrillo
2 goals
  Sebastien Perez
  Benjamin
  Damiano Maiorano
  Zak Ibsen
  Idoko Ibrahim
  Federico Hilaire
  Ali Aligoli
  Facundo Minici
  Gustavo Casado
  Jevin Albuquerque
  Qambar Sadeqi
  Cristian Torres
  Malick Dieng
  Suleiman Usman
  Miguel Beiro
  Gustavo Rosales
  Matias
40 others scored 1 goal each

Final standings

References

External links 
 FIFA Beach Soccer World Cup Rio de Janeiro 2007 , FIFA.com

 
2007
2007
Fifa Beach Soccer World Cup, 2007
FIFa